Zinc finger protein 366, also known as DC-SCRIPT (Dendritic cell-specific transcript), is a protein that in humans is encoded by the ZNF366 gene. The ZNF366 gene was first identified in a DNA comparison study between 85 kb of Fugu rubripes sequence containing 17 genes with its homologous loci in the human draft genome.

Function 

In 2006, DC-SCRIPT was isolated and characterized in human monocyte-derived dendritic cells (mo-DCs).

DC-SCRIPT contains a DNA-binding domain (11 C2H2 zinc (Zn) fingers), flanked by a proline-rich and an acidic region, which can interact with C-terminal-binding protein 1 (CtBP1), a global corepressor. In the immune system of both mice and humans, DC-SCRIPT was found to be specifically expressed in dendritic cells (DCs).
 
In COS-1 cells, DC-SCRIPT was shown to interact with the estrogen receptor DNA-binding domain (ERDBD) and represses ER activity through the association with RIP140, CtBP and histone deacetylases.

In DCs, DC-SCRIPT was found to be highly expressed in type one conventional DCs (cDC1s) under the control of PU.1. The presence of DC-SCRIPT is important for the cDC1s linage specification via maintaining Interferon regulatory factor 8 (IRF8) expression. The DC-SCRIPT deficient cDC1s had impaired capacity to capture and present cell-associated antigens and to secrete IL-12p40.

Breast cancer 

In 2010, it was shown that DC-SCRIPT can act as a coregulator of multiple nuclear receptors having opposite effects on type I vs type II NRs. DC-SCRIPT is able to repress ER and PR mediated transcription, whereas it can activate transcription mediated by RAR and PPAR.  In the same study, it was shown that breast tumor tissue expresses lower levels of DC-SCRIPT than normal breast tissue from the same patient and that DC-SCRIPT mRNA expression is an independent prognostic factor for good survival of breast cancer patients with estrogen receptor- and/or progesterone receptor-positive tumors.

References

Further reading

External links 
 

Transcription factors